Gordana Milenković (born 1966) is a politician in Serbia. She served in the Assembly of Vojvodina from 2020 to 2021 and is currently a member of the Kula municipal assembly. Milenković is a member of Serbian Progressive Party.

Private career
Milenković identifies as an entrepreneur. She lives in Crvenka in Kula.

Politician

Municipal politics
Milenković received the third position on the Progressive Party's electoral list for the 2016 local elections in Kula and was elected when the list won a narrow majority victory with nineteen out of thirty-seven mandates. The municipality subsequently experienced a period of political upheaval, and a new election was held in late 2018. Milenković received the ninth position on the Progressive list and was re-elected when it won an increased majority with twenty-six mandates.

Provincial politics
Milenković was given the forty-fourth position on the Progressive Party's Aleksandar Vučić — For Our Children list in the 2020 provincial election and was elected when the list won a majority victory with seventy-six out of 120 mandates. During her term in the assembly, she was a member of the committee on security and the committee on petitions and motions. She resigned her mandate in 2021; her resignation became official on 19 April.

References

1966 births
Living people
People from Kula, Serbia
Serbian women in politics
Members of the Assembly of Vojvodina
Serbian Progressive Party politicians